The Colonel Ephraim and Sarah Doolittle Farm is a historic farm property on Doolittle Road in Shoreham, Vermont.  It is one of the oldest colonial farm properties in western Vermont, established in 1766 by Colonel Ephraim Doolittle, a veteran of the French and Indian War and the American Revolutionary War.  It was listed on the National Register of Historic Places in 1995.

Description and history
The Doolittle Farm is located in northern Shoreham, on  bounded on the west by Vermont Route 22A, the south by Doolittle Road, and the north by the Shoreham-Bridport town line.  The western portion of the farm is wooded, and includes Prickly Ash Brook, which flows northeasterly across the property.  The eastern portion is open, with fields of pasture and agriculture.  The farm complex is set on the north side of Doolittle Road, east of the brook between the cleared and wooded areas.  In addition to the c. 1800 farmhouse, the complex includes a carriage barn, three agricultural barns from the mid-to-late 19th century, and several smaller outbuildings.  The farmhouse is a particularly fine example of early Federal period architecture, built of brick laid in common bond and covered by a hip roof.

The farm was established in 1766 by Colonel Ephraim Doolittle, a colonial militia officer who helped build the Crown Point Military Road, the area's first road, part of which runs along Doolittle Road.  Doolittle established a gristmill and sawmill on Prickly Ash Brook, whose foundational remnants survive.  Doolittle was one of the founding proprietors of Shoreham, chartered in 1788, and was a prominent local citizen for many years.  The house, dating about 1800, was probably built by Job Lane Howe, a prominent area builder credited with building other fine Federal period houses in the region.

See also
National Register of Historic Places listings in Addison County, Vermont

References

Historic districts on the National Register of Historic Places in Vermont
Farms on the National Register of Historic Places in Vermont
National Register of Historic Places in Addison County, Vermont
Federal architecture in Vermont
Buildings and structures completed in 1766
Buildings and structures in Shoreham, Vermont